Arnar Darri Pétursson (born 16 March 1991) is an Icelandic professional footballer who plays as a goalkeeper for Stjarnan.

He started his career with Stjarnan, and joined Oslo-based club Lyn in March 2008. When Lyn had financial problems in summer 2010 he was signed by SønderjyskE of the Danish Superliga. He made his international U21 debut against Scotland in the fall of 2010 when Iceland met Scotland in playoffs to reach the EM U21 Finals in Denmark 2011. Iceland won both games 2–1 and qualified.

Club career

Stjarnan
Arnar played a first team game for Stjarnanbut played with all their youth teams.

Lyn
At the time Arnar moved to Lyn they had among others Indridi Sigurdsson, Theodor Elmar Bjarnason and more quality players. He made his Norwegian Premier League debut for Lyn on 3 August 2009 against SK Brann. In the end Lyn had to sell all their best players and was in the summer of 2010 declared bankrupt. It was demoted to the Norwegian lower leagues as an amateur club. With Lyn Arnar played 15 games, five of them in the Tippeligaen.

SønderjyskE
On 1 July 2010, Arnar signed for Danish Superliga club SønderjyskE, which is located near the German border, to compete with their existing number one goalkeeper Nathan Coe. He signed for two years.

References

External links
Arnar Darri Pétursson on Facebook
Info on Melar Sport homepage

1991 births
Living people
Arnar Darri Petursson
Association football goalkeepers
Arnar Darri Petursson
Arnar Darri Petursson
Arnar Darri Petursson
Lyn Fotball players
Arnar Darri Petursson
Arnar Darri Petursson
Arnar Darri Petursson
Arnar Darri Petursson
Eliteserien players
Arnar Darri Petursson
Expatriate footballers in Norway
Expatriate men's footballers in Denmark
Arnar Darri Petursson
Arnar Darri Petursson